The David W. Brown House is a home located at 2303 E. Dartmouth. in Englewood, Colorado. An example of Prairie style the house was built and occupied by David W. Brown (1864-1922), who built the coal-mining Rocky Mountain Fuel Company.  The house has 18 rooms and 6 fireplaces.

It was designed by architect George H. Williamson.  It was listed on the National Register of Historic Places in 1980.

It is an irregular three-and-a-half-story structure.

See also
National Register of Historic Places listings in Arapahoe County, Colorado

References

External links 
 History of Colorado

Houses in Arapahoe County, Colorado
Historic districts on the National Register of Historic Places in Colorado
National Register of Historic Places in Arapahoe County, Colorado